Idaho Legislative District 1 is one of 35 districts of the Idaho Legislature. It is currently represented by State Senator Jim Woodward, Republican of Sagle, Representative Heather Scott, Republican of Blanchard, and Representative Sage Dixon, Republican of Ponderay.

District overview

Party affiliation

Cities

School districts
Boundary County School District 101
Lake Pend Oreille School District 84
Lakeland Joint School District 272
West Bonner County School District 83

List of senators and representatives

(1984–1992)
From 1984 to 1992, District 1 consisted of all of Bonner and Boundary Counties.

(1992–2002)
From 1992 to 2002, District 1 consisted of Boundary County and a portion of Bonner County.

(2002–2012)
From 2002 to 2012, District 1 consisted of Boundary County and a portion of Bonner County.

(2012–2022)
District 1 currently consists of Boundary County and a portion of Bonner County.

(2022–)
Beginning in December 2022, District 1 will consist of Boundary County and a portion of Bonner County.

Senator elections

Primary elections

Republican

Democratic

Constitution

General elections

House Seat A elections

Primary elections

Republican

Democratic

See also

 List of Idaho Senators
 List of Idaho State Representatives

References

External links
Idaho Legislative District Map (with members)

01
Boundary County, Idaho
Bonner County, Idaho